Neural Regeneration Research is a peer-reviewed scientific journal covering research on neuroregeneration and stem cells. Topics covered include neural stem cells, neural tissue engineering, gene therapy, and minimally-invasive treatment of neurodegenerative diseases. It was established in 2006 and the editors in chief are Kwok-Fai So (University of Hong Kong) and Xiao-Ming Xu (Indiana University). The journal publishes the following types of papers: research and reports, techniques and methods, investigation and analysis, meta-analyses and reviews, evidence-based case reports, and perspectives.

Abstracting and indexing 
The journal is abstracted and indexed in BIOSIS Previews, Chemical Abstracts, Excerpta Medica, Institute of Scientific & Technical Information of China, Chinese Science Citation Database, Scopus, and the Science Citation Index Expanded.

References

External links 
 

Neurology journals
Neuroscience journals
Publications established in 2006
Biweekly journals
Medknow Publications academic journals